Badules is a municipality located in the province of Zaragoza, Aragon, Spain. According to the 2010 census the municipality has a population of 95 inhabitants.

Badules is located in the Campo de Daroca comarca. French singer Aurora Lacasa, who became famous in the former GDR, was the daughter of a Spanish Republican journalist born in Badules who went into exile to France and later to Hungary after the Spanish Civil War.

Gallery

See also
Campo de Daroca
List of municipalities in Zaragoza

References

External links 

CAI Aragon - Badules
Aurora Lacasa, die Sprachen der Welt in die Musik vereint

Municipalities in the Province of Zaragoza